The 1970 ABC Junior Championship was the men's division of the inaugural edition of the Asian Basketball Confederation (ABC)'s junior championship or the Asian Youth Basketball Championship. The games were held at the Jangchung Arena in Seoul, South Korea from August 25–September 2, 1970. The age restriction was under 19.

The  won the inaugural championship by sweeping all of their assignments, after beating the hosts , 106-79, in the final day.

Results

Final standing

Awards

See also
 1970 ABC Junior Championship for Women

References

External links
 Squad for South Korea  

FIBA Asia Under-18 Championship
1970 in Asian basketball
International basketball competitions hosted by South Korea
August 1970 sports events in Asia
September 1970 sports events in Asia
1970s in Seoul